The Men's individual pursuit (B&VI 1–3) at the 2008 Summer Paralympics took place on August 7 at the Laoshan Velodrome.

Preliminaries 
In the preliminary round, Kieran Modra and Tyson Lawrence (Australia) broke their own world record, and the paralympic record set by Modra and his pilot at the 2004 Summer Paralympics, Robert Crowe.

Q = Qualifier
PR = Paralympic Record
WR = World Record

Finals 
The final rounds saw the world record broken again by Modra and Lawrence, this time taking 0.795 seconds off the time.

Gold medal match

Bronze medal match

References 

Men's individual pursuit (BandVI 1-3)